Saengal Malai is a small hill temple for Varadharaja Perumal Temple, located near the town of Velayuthampalayam in Karur district, Tamil Nadu, India.

 Gods & Goddesses:
 Varadharaja Perumal in the main karuvarai
 Andal, in a separate building to the right of Varadharaja Perumal
 Mahalakshmi, in a separate building to the left of Varadharaja Perumal
 Varaha Moorthi
 Thumbikai Alwaar
 Anjeneyar
 Acchudan
 Dhanvantari
 Sworna Adharshna Bhairavar
 Nava Graha
 Sorga Vasal, to the left of Varadharaja Perumal
 Narashimar

Hindu temples in Karur district